The Seychelles national cricket team represents the country of Seychelles in international cricket. It is organised by the Seychelles Cricket Association (SCA) which became an affiliate member of the International Cricket Council (ICC) in 2010 and an associate member in 2017.

History
Following the surrender of the Seychelles to the British Empire in the 1814 Treaty of Paris, then one can assume the game was played in some capacity in the 19th century. Following the independence of the Seychelles from the United Kingdom in 1979, the game on the islands went into decline.

Recently the game has seen an upsurge in popularity, mostly fuelled by expat communities on the island from cricket playing nations, but also involving local people. Until a few years ago the Seychelles played the Maldives and Maurindia of Mauritius in a triangular tournament.

In March 2010, SCA president Jonathon Paul declared the country's intention to apply for affiliate membership of the International Cricket Council (ICC).  This was granted, with the Seychelles being recognised as the 105th member of the ICC. Shortly after becoming a member of the ICC,  Paul announced plans to build an international standard cricket ground to encourage the growth of cricket in the Seychelles.  Land on Perseverance Island was set aside for its construction.

Seychelles made its international debut at the 2011 ICC Africa Twenty20 Division Three tournament in Ghana. The team won its first three matches, against Mali, Gambia and Morocco, ultimately losing to Rwanda by eight runs in the tournament final. Seychelles finished runner-up to Zambia at the 2012 ICC Africa Twenty20 Division Three tournament. The team was captained by Kaushal Patel and played eight matches in five days, winning six and losing two games, both to Zambia. They notably defended a total of 71 runs against Cameroon, winning by nine runs, and defeated Saint Helena in a super over with a six off the last ball.

In April 2018, the ICC decided to grant full Twenty20 International (T20I) status to all its members. Therefore, all Twenty20 matches played between the Seychelles and other ICC members after 1 January 2019 will be a full T20I.

Records and Statistics
International Match Summary — Seychelles
 
Last updated 25 November 2022

Twenty20 International 
 Highest team total: 162/3 v. Mali on 18 November 2022 at IPRC Cricket Ground, Kigali.
 Highest individual score: 50*, Stephen Madusanka v. Saint Helena on 21 November 2022 at IPRC Cricket Ground, Kigali.
 Best individual bowling figures: 3/16, Stephen Madusanka v. Kenya on 25 November 2022 at Gahanga International Cricket Stadium, Kigali.

T20I record versus other nations

Records complete to T20I #1922. Last updated 25 November 2022.

See also
 List of Seychelles Twenty20 International cricketers

References

Cricket
Cricket in the Seychelles
National cricket teams